Batu Kikir (Jawi: باتو كيكير) is a small town in Jempol District, Negeri Sembilan, Malaysia. Situated along the Tampin-Karak highway, Batu Kikir is located in between Bahau and Kuala Pilah.

It is made popular by a phrase Batu Kikir Jambatan Bosi from a line of lyrics of a popular Malaysian song "Apo Kono Eh Jang".

Tourist attractions
Batu Kikir is also known as the birthplace of Pendita Za'aba (Zainal Abidin Ahmad), a renowned intellectual and wordsmith in Malaysia. He is the first and only 'Pendita' in the country. In Batu Kikir, a museum dedicated to the legacy of Pendita Za'aba has been built by the Negeri Sembilan government and is open to the public. Known as Teratak Za'aba, the traditional kampung-house structure was constructed at Za'aba's birthplace, Bukit Kerdas in Batu Kikir. Baginda hill is also a hot tourist spot because of the view and a wave rock .

At the other side, Jeram Tengkek, starting point of Muar River. Meedium high waterfall, pedestrian along the river,  campsite, picnic suitable for family.. also from local citizen said, there is a footprint of 'HangTuah' legend warrior. 

And also Kg Lonek place of paddy field across the road to Bahau, and originality of Kampung Life when u stay at Homestay 'Tok Mudim.

Schools
SBPI Jempol
SMK Batu Kikir, 
SK Batu Kikir
SJK (C) Chi Sin

References

Jempol District
Towns in Negeri Sembilan